During the 2000–01 English football season, Portsmouth F.C. competed in the Football League First Division.

Season summary
In October, Tony Pulis was put on gardening leave (and sacked not long afterwards) due to a poor relationship with Mandaric. Veteran player Steve Claridge stepped up to the manager's seat, and some initial success saw talk of promotion to the Premier League, only for a horrific run of defeats to set in after the new year, resulting in Claridge being dismissed as manager (but retained as a player) and being replaced in March 2001 by Chelsea assistant manager Graham Rix. Rix did not prove an entirely popular appointment, as he had been jailed for a sexual offence two years previously, and the club only survived on the last day of the season when they won their final game and relegated Huddersfield Town at their expense.

Final league table

Results
Portsmouth's score comes first

Legend

Football League First Division

FA Cup

League Cup

Squad

Left club during season

References

Portsmouth F.C. seasons
Portsmouth